Radio gradska mreža - Mostarski radio is a Bosnian local public radio station, broadcasting from Mostar, Bosnia and Herzegovina.

It was launched as RGM - Mostarski radio on 1 December 2016 by Javna ustanova Centar za kulturu Mostar. This radio station broadcasts a variety of programs such as local news from Mostar area, talk shows, music and sport. Until 2016, radiostation was called Omladinski Radio X.

Program is mainly produced in Bosnian language. Estimated number of potential listeners of Mostarski radio is around 84,511. The radio station is also available in municipalities of Herzegovina and in East Herzegovina.

Frequencies
 Mostar

See also 
List of radio stations in Bosnia and Herzegovina

References

External links 
 www.fmscan.org
 www.mostarski.ba
 Communications Regulatory Agency of Bosnia and Herzegovina

Bileća
Radio stations established in 2016
Mass media in Mostar